Derek McVey (born 20 July 1968) is an Australian former professional rugby league footballer who played in the 1990s.

Background
McVey was born in Newcastle, New South Wales, Australia.

Playing career
McVey made his debut for the Gold Coast in Round 18 against Illawarra with McVey scoring a try in a 20–12 defeat.  McVey joined Balmain in 1992 making 12 appearances for the club in his first year there.  In 1994, McVey played 9 games as Balmain finished last on the table and claimed only their 4th wooden spoon since joining the competition as a foundation team in 1908.

In 1995, Balmain changed their name to the "Sydney Tigers" and moved their home games to Parramatta Stadium at the start of the Super League war.  McVey played 20 times for the club in 1995 as they finished 15th on the table.

Mcvey then signed with English side St Helens and played as forward collecting three trophies in the Super League for The Saints.

Coaching career
He is the current coach for the new club (est. 2018) Southwest Florida Copperheads who compete in the USA Rugby League (South Conference).

References

External links
Saints Heritage Society profile

1968 births
Living people
Balmain Tigers players
Gold Coast Chargers players
Rugby league coaches
Rugby league players from Newcastle, New South Wales
Rugby league second-rows
Southwest Florida Copperheads coaches
St Helens R.F.C. players